Rauenberg is a town in the district of Rhein-Neckar-Kreis, in Baden-Württemberg,  Germany. It is situated 15 km south of Heidelberg.

References

Rhein-Neckar-Kreis